"More Than Meets the Eye" is a 1989 single released by the Swedish rock band Europe. It was the fourth single released from the band's fourth studio album Out of This World. It was only released in France, Spain and Japan.

The song was co-written by Europe vocalist Joey Tempest, guitarist Kee Marcello and keyboardist Mic Michaeli.

Track listing
"More Than Meets the Eye"
"Let the Good Times Rock"

Personnel
Joey Tempest − lead vocals
Kee Marcello − guitars, background vocals
John Levén − bass guitar
Mic Michaeli − keyboards, background vocals
Ian Haugland − drums, background vocals

References

1989 singles
Europe (band) songs
Songs written by Joey Tempest
1988 songs
Epic Records singles
Song recordings produced by Ron Nevison
Songs written by Mic Michaeli